C120 or C-120 may refer to:

 120 minute Compact Cassette, an audio cassette with 60 minutes recording time on each side
 Olympus C-120, a late-1990s digital camera

See also
 Fairchild XC-120 Packplane